The 2018 Challenger Ciudad de Guayaquil was a professional tennis tournament played on clay courts. It was the fourteenth edition of the tournament which was part of the 2018 ATP Challenger Tour. It took place in Guayaquil, Ecuador between October 29 and November 3, 2018.

Singles main-draw entrants

Seeds

 1 Rankings are as of 22 October 2018.

Other entrants
The following players received wildcards into the singles main draw:
  Nicolás Álvarez
  Emilio Gómez
  José Hernández-Fernández
  Diego Hidalgo

The following player received entry into the singles main draw using a protected ranking:
  Santiago Giraldo

The following players received entry from the qualifying draw:
  Federico Coria
  Martín Cuevas
  Thiago Seyboth Wild
  Juan Pablo Varillas

The following players received entry as lucky losers:
  Ulises Blanch
  Miljan Zekić

Champions

Singles

 Guido Andreozzi def.  Pedro Sousa 7–5, 1–6, 6–4.

Doubles

 Guillermo Durán /  Roberto Quiroz def.  Thiago Monteiro /  Fabrício Neis 6–3, 6–2.

External links
Official Website

2018 ATP Challenger Tour
2018